50th Birthday Celebration Volume 3: Locus Solus is a live album of improvised music by Anton Fier, Arto Lindsay and John Zorn documenting their performance at Tonic in September 2003 as part of Zorn's month-long 50th Birthday Celebration concert series.

Reception

The Allmusic review by Sean Westergaard awarded the album 4 stars stating "The level of communication between players is stunning, developing lurching, spastic grooves that then get blown apart like ducks in a shooting gallery... Certainly not for all tastes, this is a noisy, fun listen."

Track listing

Personnel
John Zorn – alto saxophone 
Anton Fier – drums
Arto Lindsay – guitar, voice

References

Albums produced by John Zorn
John Zorn live albums
2004 live albums
Tzadik Records live albums